Sam Smith (born January 8, 1955) is an American former professional basketball player in the National Basketball Association (NBA).

College career
A 6'4" tall shooting guard, Smith played college basketball at the UNLV, during the 1970s. He helped the Runnin' Rebels reach their first ever NCAA Final Four in 1977, as a member of the fabled "Hardway Eight", that was coached by Jerry Tarkanian.

Professional career
Smith played two seasons (1978–1980) in the NBA, as a member of the Milwaukee Bucks and Chicago Bulls. He averaged 6.8 points per game during his NBA career. Smith completed the first four-point play in the NBA's history, on October 21, 1979.

Personal life
Smith was born in Ferriday, Louisiana. He is now living in Las Vegas, and working as an AAU basketball trainer and coach at the Bill and Lilly Heinrich YMCA. Where he worked with his fellow UNLV legend and teammate, Robert Smith.

References

1955 births
Living people
21st-century African-American people
African-American basketball players
American men's basketball players
Atlanta Hawks draft picks
Basketball players from Louisiana
Chicago Bulls players
Junior college men's basketball players in the United States
Milwaukee Bucks players
People from Ferriday, Louisiana
Seminole State College of Florida alumni
Shooting guards
UNLV Runnin' Rebels basketball players
20th-century African-American sportspeople